Queen of Broadway is a 1942 American drama film directed by Sam Newfield and written by Rusty McCullough and George Wallace Sayre. The film stars Rochelle Hudson, Buster Crabbe, Paul Bryar, Emmett Lynn, Donald Mayo and Isabelle LaMal. The film was released on November 24, 1942, by Producers Releasing Corporation.

Plot

Cast       
Rochelle Hudson as Sherry Baker
Buster Crabbe as Ricky Sloane
Paul Bryar as Rosy
Emmett Lynn as Chris
Donald Mayo as Jimmy Carson
Isabelle LaMal as Mrs. Barnett
Blanche Rose as Mrs. Ogilvie
Henry Hall as Judge John Marsh
John Dilson as Bickel
Milton Kibbee as Joe
Vince Barnett as Schultz
Jack Mulhall as Bookie
Fred Toones as Mose

References

External links
 

1942 films
American drama films
1942 drama films
Producers Releasing Corporation films
Films directed by Sam Newfield
American black-and-white films
1940s English-language films
1940s American films